Khaibar Omar (born 1 June 1996) is an Afghan cricketer. He made his List A debut for Afghanistan A against Zimbabwe A during their tour to Zimbabwe on 27 January 2017. He made his Twenty20 debut for Kabul Eagles in the 2017 Shpageeza Cricket League on 11 September 2017. He made his first-class debut for Boost Region in the 2017–18 Ahmad Shah Abdali 4-day Tournament on 26 October 2017.

In September 2018, he was named in Nangarhar's squad in the first edition of the Afghanistan Premier League tournament.

References

External links
 

1996 births
Living people
Afghan cricketers
Boost Defenders cricketers
Kabul Eagles cricketers
Nangarhar Leopards cricketers